Dawa'er Hob, (English: Circles of Love) is an Arabic television series produced in 2014.

The series revolves around family relations and social life among a group of characters. Three girls live in Abu-Dhabi and search love in their lives. Each character would have something or more from our surrounding whether at home, work or street, which enables the viewer to find himself in the story's characters of the series. 

The series is filmed in Abu-Dhabi, Dubai, Lebanon, Egypt and Switzerland. No. of episodes: 60.

Cast 
 Rajaa el Jidawi
 Abdel Rahim Hassan
 Hasnaa Saif el Din
 Dalida Khalil
 Ibrahim el Harby
 Hisham Magdy
 Yaacoub Abdallah
 Shaima Sabet
 Yasser Al-Masri
 Mondher Rayahneh
 Ahmad Jalal Abdel Qawy
 Sumoud el Qandari
 Ingie Al Moqdam
 Rabih Zeitoun
 Shaker Jaber
 Adel Metwalli
 Rania Fahed
 Dunia el Masri
 Huda Al Ghanem
 Mohammed Noor
 Mansour el Ghassani
 Jessy Abdo
 Ousama Assad
 Hassan Hani
 Tara Emad
 Yvonne Maalouf
 Khuloud Issa
 Abdallah al Saif
 Samah Ghandour
 Noha Saleh
 Raja'i Qawas
 Abdel Rahman Malik
 Ola Yassin
 Tha'er Moqbel
 Rawan Mahdawi
 Najwa el Taher
 Martina Roufa'il
 Lina Azar
 Moussa Elias Faze'
 Mohamad Abou Atwan
 Fawzi Al Debbas
 Mohamad Da'is
 Natasha Choufani

See also
 List of Egyptian television series

References 

Egyptian drama television series